The Kuolajoki is a river in the south of the Kola Peninsula in Murmansk Oblast, Russia and in Lapland, Finland. The Kuolajoki originates in the Lake Kuolayarvi in Russia and flows into the river Tenniöjoki in Finland. Its biggest tributary is the Kolsanoya.

Rivers of Murmansk Oblast
Rivers of Finland
Kemijoki basin
Rivers of Salla
International rivers of Europe